Yuki Baba (born 15 October 1992) is a Japanese politician from the Constitutional Democratic Party who has been a member of the House of Representatives since 2021. He represents the Second District of Fukushima prefecture as part of the Tohoku proportional representation block.

He is the first member of the National Diet who was born in the Heisei era along with Shin Tsuchida.

References 

1992 births
Living people
21st-century Japanese politicians
Rikken Minseitō politicians

Members of the House of Representatives (Japan)